Yiin Chii-ming (born 2 June 1952) is Taiwanese politician. He was the Minister of the Council for Economic Planning and Development (CEPD) of the Executive Yuan from 2012 to 2013.

Education
Yiin obtained his bachelor's degree from the Department of Computer Science and Control Engineering of National Chiao Tung University in 1974 and master's degree from the Institute of Management Science of the same university in 1978. He obtained his doctoral degree from the Graduate School of Business Administration of National Chengchi University in 1989.

Personal life
Yiin is married with one son and one daughter.

References

Living people
Taiwanese Ministers of Economic Affairs
1952 births
National Chiao Tung University alumni
National Chengchi University alumni